Tomaspis is a genus of true bug from the Cercopidae family. The species was first described scientifically by Amyot & Serville in 1843.

Species 
23 species are recognized within Tomaspis:

 Tomaspis basifura Melichar, 1912
 Tomaspis biolleyi (Distant, 1900)
 Tomaspis costalimar Franco, 1953
 Tomaspis crocea (Walker, 1851)
 Tomaspis cruralis (Stål, 1862)
 Tomaspis discoidea Melichar, 1915
 Tomaspis flexuosa (Walker, 1851)
 Tomaspis furcata (Germar, 1821)
 Tomaspis handlirschi Fowler, 1897
 Tomaspis inclusa (Walker, 1858)
 Tomaspis intermedia Fowler, 1897
 Tomaspis miles Fowler, 1897
 Tomaspis nigricans Amyot & Serville, 1843
 Tomaspis nigrofasciata Melichar, 1908
 Tomaspis perezii Berg, 1879
 Tomaspis platensis Berg, 1883
 Tomaspis pulchralis Valdes Ragues, 1910
 Tomaspis rubripennis (Blanchard & Brulle, 1846)
 Tomaspis rufopicea (Walker, 1852)
 Tomaspis semimaculata Fowler, 1897
 Tomaspis tripars (Walker, 1858)
 Tomaspis venosa (Walker, 1851)
 Tomaspis xanthocephala (Walker, 1858)

References

Cercopidae
Insects described in 1843